The Kenosha Twins were a Minor League Baseball team that played in Kenosha, Wisconsin, from 1984 to 1992. They began play in the Midwest League in 1984 when the Wisconsin Rapids Twins relocated.  The team played their home games at Simmons Field in Kenosha. The Twins won two Midwest League championships, in 1985 and 1987, and were Northern Division champions for the first half of the 1988 season. The team was sold in 1992 and relocated to Fort Wayne, Indiana, as the Fort Wayne Wizards after the season.

Ballpark
The franchise played their home games at Simmons Field, located on Sheridan Road near the shore of Lake Michigan in Kenosha.

Notable alumni

 Eddie Guardado (1991–92) 2 x MLB AS; 2002 AL Saves Leader
 Damian Miller (1992) MLB All-Star 
 Dan Naulty (1992)
 Brad Radke (1992) MLB All-Star 
 Rich Becker (1991)
 Midre Cummings (1991)
 Denny Hocking (1991)
 Todd Ritchie (1991)
 Marty Cordova (1990) 1995 AL Rookie of the Year
 Pat Meares (1990)
 Jayhawk Owens (1990)
 Rich Garces (1989)
 Chuck Knoblauch (1989)4 x MLB All-Star ; 1991 AL Rookie of the Year
 Pat Mahomes (1989)
 Denny Neagle (1989) 2 x MLB All-Star ; 1997 NL Wins Leader
 Alan Newman (1989)
 Mike Trombley (1989)
 Willie Banks (1988)
 Ron Gardenhire (1988, MGR) MLB MGR; 2010 AL Manager of the Year
 Lenny Webster (1986–88)
 Chip Hale (1987) MLB MGR
 Scott Leius (1987)
 Paul Abbott (1986–87)
 Yorkis Perez (1986)
 Duffy Dyer (1984–85, MGR)

Year-by-year record

References

Defunct Midwest League teams
Minnesota Twins minor league affiliates
Professional baseball teams in Wisconsin
Defunct minor league baseball teams
Sports in Kenosha, Wisconsin
Defunct baseball teams in Wisconsin
1984 establishments in Wisconsin
Baseball teams established in 1984
Baseball teams disestablished in 1992
1992 disestablishments in Wisconsin